The Subaru Elten was a concept hybrid 4WD hatchback manufactured by Subaru. Introduced at the 1997 Tokyo Motor Show. The vehicle was a successor to the 360 taking many design elements from the vehicle even a similar grille. The design was later scrapped for a different model.

References

 
 

Subaru vehicles
All-wheel-drive vehicles
Hybrid vehicles
Cars introduced in 1997